Howe is a neighborhood within the larger Longfellow community in Minneapolis. It is bordered by the Cooper and Longfellow neighborhoods to the north, Corcoran and Standish to the west, Hiawatha to the south, and the Mississippi River to the east. The neighborhood and its elementary school are named for Julia Ward Howe.

See also
 Neighborhoods of Minneapolis
Min Hi Line

External links
 Minneapolis Neighborhood Profile - Howe

References & External Links

 Howe School's website:  hiawatha.mpls.k12.mn.us

Neighborhoods in Minneapolis
Minnesota populated places on the Mississippi River